A dimple is a facial feature. 

Dimple or Dimples may also refer to:

People
Dimple Chopade (born 1985), Indian film actress
Dimple Jhangiani (born 1988), Indian television actress
Dimple Kapadia (born 1957), Indian Bollywood actress
Dimple Yadav (born 1978), Indian politician
Elizabeth Cooper (1914–1960), Scottish-Filipina film actress, vaudeville dancer and singer, mistress of General Douglas MacArthur, nicknamed "Dimples"
Richard "Dimples" Fields (1942–2000), American R&B and soul singer
"Dolly Dimples", a stage name of circus fat lady Celesta Geyer (1901–1982)
Dimples Romana (born 1984), Filipino actress

Places in the United States
Dimple, Arkansas, an unincorporated community
Dimple, Kentucky, an unincorporated community

Films
Dimples (1916 film), starring Mary Miles Minter
Dimples (1936 film), starring Shirley Temple

Music
"Dimples" (song), by John Lee Hooker
"Dimple", a song on the EP Love Yourself: Her by South Korean boy band BTS
The Dimples, a backing trio of singers for American R&B singer Eddie Cooley

Other uses
one of the indentations on a golf ball
Dimple Entertainment, a former Japanese video game development and publishing company
Haig (whisky), a brand of Scotch whisky also known as Dimple
the title character of the early American comic strip Dolly Dimples
the main villainess in the 1997 animated film Cats Don't Dance
a fictional character in the UK comic The Dandy; see Cuddles and Dimples